Gregorc is a surname. Notable people with the surname include:

 Anthony Gregorc, American psychologist
 Blaž Gregorc (born 1990), Slovenian ice hockey player
 Luka Gregorc (born 1984), Slovenian tennis player

Slovene-language surnames